Johann Schädler (born 8 June 1939) is a Liechtensteiner luger. He competed in the men's singles event at the 1964 Winter Olympics.

References

1939 births
Living people
Liechtenstein male lugers
Olympic lugers of Liechtenstein
Lugers at the 1964 Winter Olympics
Place of birth missing (living people)